Megalopolis is an upcoming American epic science fiction drama film written, directed and produced by Francis Ford Coppola. The film features an ensemble cast that includes Adam Driver, Forest Whitaker, Nathalie Emmanuel, Jon Voight, Laurence Fishburne, Aubrey Plaza, Shia LaBeouf, Jason Schwartzman, Grace VanderWaal, Kathryn Hunter, Talia Shire, Dustin Hoffman, D.B. Sweeney and Giancarlo Esposito.

Premise
In New York, a woman is divided between loyalties to her father, who has a classical view of society, and her lover, who is more progressive and ready for the future.

Cast

 Adam Driver as Caesar 
 Forest Whitaker
 Nathalie Emmanuel
 Jon Voight
 Laurence Fishburne 
 Aubrey Plaza
 Jason Schwartzman
 Shia LaBeouf
 Talia Shire
 Grace VanderWaal
 Kathryn Hunter
 James Remar
 Chloe Fineman
 Madeleine Gardella
 Isabelle Kusman
 D. B. Sweeney as Commissioner Hart 
 Bailey Ives
 Dustin Hoffman
 Giancarlo Esposito as Mayor Cicero

Production

Early attempts

Francis Ford Coppola started writing Megalopolis in the 1980s, being a passion project for him. Actor Rob Lowe said that Coppola was talking about the project when they were shooting The Outsiders in 1982. In a May 2007 interview with Ain't It Cool News, Coppola stated his agreements to direct Bram Stoker's Dracula (1992), Jack (1996), and The Rainmaker (1997) were done to get out of debt and fund Megalopolis.

By 2001, Coppola began holding table reads with actors including Russell Crowe, Robert De Niro, Leonardo DiCaprio, Nicolas Cage, Paul Newman, Kevin Spacey, James Gandolfini, Edie Falco, and Uma Thurman, and recorded roughly 30 hours of second-unit footage of New York City with Ron Fricke, all of which he discarded after 9/11. In response to this, Coppola stated "It made it really pretty tough... a movie about the aspiration of utopia with New York as a main character and then all of a sudden you couldn't write about New York without just dealing with what happened and the implications of what happened. The world was attacked and I didn't know how to try to do with that. I tried". In 2007, Coppola stated he had abandoned the project.

Pre-production
Coppola returned to the project 12 years later when in May 2019 he announced he would resume development, and had approached Jude Law and Shia LaBeouf for lead roles. In August 2021, it was confirmed that discussions with actors to star in the film had begun; James Caan was set to star while Oscar Isaac, Forest Whitaker, Cate Blanchett, Jon Voight, Zendaya, Michelle Pfeiffer, and Jessica Lange were in various stages of negotiations. By March 2022, Coppola's sister, Talia Shire, expressed her interest in joining the cast, and Isaac was reported to have passed on the project. The previous month, Coppola said he spent $120 million of his own money and sold a "significant piece of his wine empire" to produce the film. By May, the budget was reported to be under $100 million, while Whitaker and Voight were confirmed for the cast, with Adam Driver, Nathalie Emmanuel, and Laurence Fishburne added. On July 6, Caan, who was still in negotiations for the film, died. Pre-production had begun by mid-July 2022, with Mihai Mălaimare Jr. serving as cinematographer. In August, Aubrey Plaza, Jason Schwartzman, Grace VanderWaal, Kathryn Hunter and James Remar joined the cast, with Shire and LaBeouf also confirmed to be part of the cast. Chloe Fineman, Madeleine Gardella, Isabelle Kusman, D. B. Sweeney, Bailey Ives and Dustin Hoffman would be added in October. In January 2023, Giancarlo Esposito was added to the cast.

Filming
Principal photography began at Trilith Studios in Georgia on November 1, 2022, with set photos of LaBeouf and Emmanuel filming in Atlanta being published on November 8 and is due to finish in March 2023. The film was originally shooting using OSVP technology at Prysm Stage, Trilith Studios, but "as the challenges and costs of that approach have mounted, the production is attempting to pivot to a less costly, more traditional greenscreen approach".

By January 2023, the film was halfway into filming when reports indicated the budget ballooned higher than its original $120 million price tag, which multiple journalists compared to the production issues of Coppola's 1979 film Apocalypse Now. Due to the reported "unstable filming environment", several crew members were revealed to have exited the film, including production designer Beth Mickle, art director David Scott, and visual effects supervisor Mark Russell, along with the rest of the visual effects team. Coppola and Driver contested the report, stating that while there was some turnover in crew, the production was on schedule and on budget and moving along smoothly. At the same time, Mike Figgis directed a behind-the-scenes documentary on the production of Megalopolis. Driver wrapped filming his part in early March calling it "one of the best ... shooting experiences of (his) life." On March 12 2023, Coppola stated that filming had wrapped.

References

External links
 

Upcoming films
American epic films
American science fiction drama films
American Zoetrope films
Films directed by Francis Ford Coppola
Films produced by Francis Ford Coppola
Films set in New York City
Films shot at Trilith Studios
Films shot in Atlanta
Films with screenplays by Francis Ford Coppola
Upcoming English-language films